The Roman Catholic Archdiocese of Medan is an archdiocese located in the city of Medan in Sumatra in Indonesia.

History
 June 30, 1911: Established as the Apostolic Prefecture of Sumatra from the Apostolic Vicariate of Batavia
 December 27, 1923: Renamed as Apostolic Prefecture of Padang
 July 18, 1932: Promoted as Apostolic Vicariate of Padang
 December 23, 1941: Renamed as Apostolic Vicariate of Medan
 January 3, 1961: Promoted as Metropolitan Archdiocese of Medan

Leadership
 Archbishops of Medan (Roman rite)
 Archbishop Kornelius Sipayung, O.F.M. Cap. (December 8, 2018 - now) 
Archbishop Anicetus Bongsu Antonius Sinaga, O.F.M. Cap. (February 12, 2009 – December 7, 2018 retired) 
 Archbishop Alfred Gonti Pius Datubara, O.F.M. Cap. (May 24, 1976 – February 12, 2009 retired)
 Archbishop Antoine Henri van den Hurk, O.F.M. Cap. (January 3, 1961 – May 24, 1976)
 Vicars Apostolic of Medan (Roman Rite) 
 Bishop Antoine Henri van den Hurk, O.F.M. Cap. (later Archbishop) (January 1, 1955 – January 3, 1961)
 Bishop Mattia Leonardo Trudone Brans, O.F.M. Cap. (December 23, 1941 – 1954)
 Vicars Apostolic of Padang (Roman Rite) 
 Bishop Mattia Leonardo Trudone Brans, O.F.M. Cap. (July 18, 1932 – December 23, 1941)
 Prefects Apostolic of Padang (Roman Rite) 
 Bishop Mattia Leonardo Trudone Brans, O.F.M. Cap. (July 22, 1921 – July 18, 1932)
Prefects Apostolic of Sumatra (Roman Rite) 
 Fr. Liberato da Exel, O.F.M. Cap. (1916 – 1921)
 Fr. Giacomo Cluts, O.F.M. Cap. (1911 – 1916)

Suffragan dioceses
 Padang
 Sibolga

References

Sources
 GCatholic.org
 Catholic Hierarchy

Roman Catholic dioceses in Indonesia
Christian organizations established in 1911
Roman Catholic dioceses and prelatures established in the 20th century